Franz Huber was an Austrian luger who competed during the 1980s. A natural track luger, he won two medals in the men's doubles event at the FIL World Luge Natural Track Championships with a silver in 1982 and a bronze in 1984.

References
Natural track World Championships results: 1979-2007

Austrian male lugers
Living people
Year of birth missing (living people)